"Más Rica Que Ayer" is a song by Puerto Rican rapper Anuel AA, Puerto Rican producer duo Mambo Kingz and Puerto Rican DJ and producer DJ Luian. It was released on March 2, 2023, and it is supposed to be lead single from Anuel AA's upcoming EP Rompe Corazones.

Background and composition  
Anuel AA announced the collaboration uploading a story from filming the music video of the song. This is the first collaboration between Anuel, Mambo Kingz and DJ Luian after the song "Tú No Amas".

In the lyrics, Anuel AA mentioned Colombian singer Shakira and Spanish football player Gerard Piqué.

Music video 
The music video was produced by TruViews and Anuel AA. It shows a couple loving and fighting each other and the artists dancing. At the end of the video Maluma appeared alongside Anuel AA, Mambo Kingz and DJ Luian. Anuel AA also attacked indirectly Colombian singer and ex-girlfriend Karol G telling that "they go global when they make songs about me".

Charts

References 

2023 singles
2023 songs
Anuel AA songs
Spanish-language songs
Songs written by Anuel AA